The 2017 European Table Tennis Championships was held in Luxembourg City, Luxembourg from 13–17 September 2017. The venue for the competition was d'Coque. The competition featured team events for men and women, with the winning teams qualifying for the 2018 ITTF Team World Cup.

Schedule
Two team events were contested.

Medal summary

Medal table

Medalists

See also
2017 ITTF World Tour
2017 ITTF World Tour Grand Finals

External links
Official website
ITTF website

References

 
European Table Tennis Championships
European Table Tennis Championships
European Table Tennis Championships
International sports competitions hosted by Luxembourg
Table tennis in Luxembourg
Sports competitions in Luxembourg City
September 2017 sports events in Europe